The Metropolitan Turnpike Trust (officially the Commissioners of the Turnpike Roads in the Neighbourhood of the Metropolis North of the River Thames) was the body responsible for maintaining the main roads in the north of the conurbation of London from 1827 to 1872. The commissioners took over from fourteen existing turnpike trusts, and were empowered to levy tolls to meet the costs of road maintenance.

Creation
There was pressure from business interests in north London, who found that the numerous toll-gates throughout the area were interfering with the passage of goods and conduct of trade. John Loudon McAdam persuaded Parliament to consolidate all the turnpike roads in the London area under one Metropolitan Turnpike Trust in 1825, to which he was appointed Surveyor-General. The Metropolitan Trust was created by a private act of Parliament (4 Geo IV c.142). The fourteen trusts consolidated were:
Kensington
Brentford
Isleworth
Uxbridge
Marylebone
Harrow
Kilburn
Highgate and Hampstead
City Road
Stamford Hill and Green Lanes
Old Street
Hackney
Lea Bridge
Camden Town

The total length of roads was 129¼ miles, and Sir James McAdam was appointed General Surveyor of the Metropolis Turnpike Roads north of the Thames.

Commissioners
The commissioners initially consisted of the members of parliament for the City of London, City of Westminster, and County of Middlesex along with forty peers and gentlemen named in the 1826 Act. Any vacancies occurring after this were to be filled by co-option.

Metropolitan Turnpikes Act 1829
In 1829 a further, public, act was passed which placed the commissioners on a statutory basis, and gave them increased powers. They were empowered to construct three new roads:
From Stamford Hill to Camden Town (the present Seven Sisters Road/Camden Road)
A short realignment of the main Hertford Road at Enfield Highway (the former route becoming "Old Road")
A road from the Lea Bridge Road in Walthamstow to the main London – Epping Turnpike Road: the modern Woodford New Road.

A number of roads in central London were declared highways and transferred from the care of the commissioners to the local parish authorities. The roads remaining under the trust were organised into sixteen districts, with different tolls applied, and the funds gathered being applied to the maintenance of the roads in the district:

First District: Roads in Westminster, Kensington, Chelsea, Fulham, Ealing and Hanwell, including The Great Western or Old Brentford Road from Knightsbridge to Brentford.
Second District: The remainder of the Great West road from Brentford to Bedfont along with other main roads in Isleworth, Hounslow, Teddington and Twickenham.
Third District: Comprised the Uxbridge Road west from Tyburn to the seventh mile stone, and Church Lane, Kensington.
Fourth District: Included the remainder of the Uxbridge Road, and the present Hanger Lane / Gunnersbury Avenue. 
Fifth District: A projected road from the Uxbridge Road at Shepherd's Bush to Turnham Green on the Great Western Road.
Sixth District: The road from Paddington to Harrow-on-the-Hill.
Seventh District: The modern Maida Vale and Kilburn High Roads.
Eighth District: The Edgware Road (running from Kilburn in the Seventh District to Edgware).
Ninth District: The modern Euston Road with other main roads in St Pancras, Islington and Kentish Town.
Tenth District: The City Road
Eleventh District: The road from Shoreditch to Lower Edmonton
Twelfth District: The continuation of the road in the Eleventh District from Lower Edmonton to the Hertfordshire/Middlesex boundary at Cheshunt.
Thirteenth District: The Green Lanes Road from Newington Green to Enfield.
Fourteenth District: The Seven Sisters Road
Fifteenth District: main roads in Hackney and Shoreditch
Sixteenth District: Lea Bridge Road and the new road to Woodford.

Competition from the railways
In 1838 the trust gathered tolls to the value of £83,497. By 1840 the amount had declined to £67,475 as a direct result of the opening of railways in the capital. The commissioners were forced to look for economies, and in 1841 they announced that they would cease to light the roads, and offered the light fittings to the parish vestries along the roads free of charge. In some parts of the metropolis the vestries refused, or were unable, to take over the lighting.

In spite of the declining finances, the commissioners were given more responsibilities: the New North Road from Highbury to Shoreditch was placed under their care in 1849, and in 1850 the roads of the Marylebone and Finchley Turnpike Trust.

Ending of the turnpikes in the Metropolis
By the 1850s the unpopular tolls were under attack. A parliamentary Toll Reform Committee was formed, and in 1857 it issued a report. In it, it was pointed out the commission itself was unrepresentative, it contained four MPs from the City of London, which was untolled, and two from Westminster, which had only one gate. However the constituencies of Finsbury, Marylebone and Tower Hamlets, which were heavily tolled, had no representation. The campaign eventually led to the enactment of the Metropolis Roads Amendment Act 1863 (c.78). From 1 July 1864 the tollgates were to be removed from most of the roads, with administration passing to the incorporated vestries and district boards established by the Metropolis Management Act 1855.

The commissioners retained control of arterial roads outside the area of the Metropolitan Board of Works: 
The "Great Western Road" from the Hammersmith boundary to Isleworth.
The "Uxbridge Road" from Hammersmith boundary to Uxbridge.
The "Harrow Road" from the Hampstead boundary to Harrow.
The "Kilburn Road" from the Hampstead boundary to Sparrows Herne in Hertfordshire
The "Green Lanes Road" outside the Metropolis
The "Seven Sisters Road" from the Islington boundary
The "Stamford Hill Road" from the Hackney boundary to Enfield
The "Lea Bridge Road" from the Hackney boundary to Snaresbrook.

Abolition
The commissioners went out of existence on 1 July 1872, when section 13 of the Annual Turnpike Acts Continuance Act 1871 (C.115) came into effect. The roads under the care of the trust passed to the various parish vestries on that date.

References

Turnpike roads in the United Kingdom
Roads in London
1827 establishments in England
1872 disestablishments in England
19th century in London
Transport policy in the United Kingdom
Organizations established in 1827
Organizations disestablished in 1872